Parçay-Meslay is a commune in the Indre-et-Loire department, central France.

Population

Education
 the commune has one school with 217 students, with 75 in preschool (école maternelle) and 142 in elementary school. The preschool and elementary school are in the groupe scolaire "Les Néfliers". Students go to a junior high school (collège) in Vouvray, Collège public Gaston Huet.

See also
Communes of the Indre-et-Loire department
 Tours Loire Valley Airport

References

External links

 Home page 

Communes of Indre-et-Loire